Larry Farmer may refer to:

Larry Farmer (basketball) (born 1951), former men's head basketball coach at UCLA and Loyola University Chicago
Larry Farmer (law professor) (born 1942), professor at Brigham Young University